Giglio Campese is a village in Tuscany, central Italy, administratively a frazione of the comune of Isola del Giglio, province of Grosseto. At the time of the 2001 census its population amounted to 154.

Geography 
Giglio Campese is located on the north-western coastal side of Giglio Island and it is about 5 km from the municipal seat of Giglio Castello. It is an important seaside resort and one of the three towns on the island – along with Giglio Castello and Giglio Porto.

Main sights 
 San Rocco (20th century), the main church of the village, it was built in 1993 and it is included in the parish of San Pietro Apostolo in Giglio Castello.
 Tower of Campese, built as a coastal defense tower by Cosimo I de' Medici in the late 16th century, it was then transformed into a private house.

See also 
 Giannutri

References

Further reading 
 Marco Lambertini, Isola del Giglio. Natura, storia, escursioni via terra e via mare, Pisa, Pacini Editore, 1989.

Frazioni of Isola del Giglio